Elena Emilievna Zelenskaya (born 1 June 1961) is a Russian operatic soprano at the Bolshoi Theatre.

Career
From 20 May to 5 June 2009, Zelenskaya, along with Aleksandr Antonenko, Mikhail Agafonov, James Morris, Christian Jean, and Matteo Peiron, performed Giacomo Puccini's Tosca, which was conducted by Stefan Solyom. In 2010, Zelenskaya performed Benjamin Britten's War Requiem, which was conducted by Tadaaki Otaka and had a cast of such singers as Timothy Robinson and Stephan Loges.

From 21-22 November 2014, Zelenskaya performed Classic Nights in Romania, along with Margarita Mamsirova, Lolita Semenina, and Roman Muravitsky.

See also 

 List of Russian opera singers

References

1961 births
Living people
Russian operatic sopranos
21st-century Russian women opera singers